The Boardwalk Battle Tournament is an early-season college basketball tournament operated by the Naismith Memorial Basketball Hall of Fame that takes place in early December of each year. 

The tournament had its inaugural run in December 2018. The tournament's name was changed from the Boardwalk Classic to the Boardwalk Battle Tournament in 2019.

History
Beginning in December 2018, the Boardwalk Battle Tournament featured eight teams in a quadruple header.

Yearly Results

Wins By Team

References

Naismith Memorial Basketball Hall of Fame
College basketball competitions
Basketball in New Jersey
Sports competitions in Atlantic City, New Jersey
2018 establishments in New Jersey